Tail fin or tailfin may refer to:

 Car tailfin of an automobile
 Caudal fin of a fish
 Vertical stabilizer of an airplane